The Edgar Allan Poe Awards (popularly called the Edgars), named after Edgar Allan Poe, are presented every year by the Mystery Writers of America. They remain the most prestigious awards in the entire mystery genre. The award for Best Young Adult Mystery was established in 1989 and recognizes works written for ages twelve to eighteen, and grades eight through twelve. Prior to the establishment of this award, the Mystery Writers of America awarded a special Edgar to Katherine Paterson for The Master Puppeteer in 1977.

Winners

1989-1999

2000s

2010s

2020s

See also 
 Edgar Award
 Mystery Writers of America
 :Category:Edgar Award winners
 :Category:Edgar Award winning works

References

External links
 The official website of Edgar Awards (includes nominees)

Lists of writers by award
Mystery and detective fiction awards
Young adult literature awards
English-language literary awards